Amenable may refer to:

 Amenable group
 Amenable species
 Amenable number
 Amenable set

See also
 Agreeableness